Enduri pitha, also known as Haldi patra pitha, is a variety of pitha made in the Indian state of Odisha mostly in the northern, eastern and central region. Ingredients are turmeric leaves, black gram, rice flour, coconut or Chhena, jaggery, black pepper. Enduri is mostly prepared during Prathamastami and Manabasa Gurubara. It is a light snack and has laxative effect because of the turmeric leaves that are used to wrap the pitha. Traditionally, enduri used to be made by steaming in large earthen pots. Enduri is one of the many other pithas offered to Jagannath in the Jagannath Temple, Puri for "Sakala dhupa" (breakfast).

See also
Odia cuisine
Prathamastami
List of steamed foods

References

Odia cuisine
Steamed foods